ImageMovers (IM), known as South Side Amusement Company until 1997, is an American production company which produces CGI animation, motion-capture, live-action films and television shows. The company is known for producing such films as Cast Away (2000), What Lies Beneath (2000), The Polar Express (2004), Monster House (2006), and Beowulf (2007). From 2007 to 2011, The Walt Disney Company and ImageMovers founded a joint venture animation facility known as ImageMovers Digital which produced two motion-captured CGI-animated films: A Christmas Carol (2009) and Mars Needs Moms (2011) for Walt Disney Pictures, neither of which were financially successful.

History

South Side Amusement Company (1984–1997) 
On March 1, 1984, Robert Zemeckis incorporated and founded the company as South Side Amusement Company. The company was in-name only from the beginning.

In the early 1990s, Zemeckis signed a production deal with Universal Pictures, to release films under the South Side Amusement Company banner. There, it is one of the producers of Death Becomes Her, Trespass, The Public Eye, The Frighteners and Contact.

Early years as ImageMovers (1997–2007)
In 1997, it was announced that South Side Amusement Company was rebranded as ImageMovers, and hired Creative Artists Agency employee Jack Rapke and producer Steve Starkey (who was a producer on Zemeckis' films he's directing since his stint as associate producer on 1988's Who Framed Roger Rabbit) came on board to join the company. It was also announced that ImageMovers signed a non-exclusive feature film deal with DreamWorks Pictures.

In 2001, the studio tried to sign a deal with Warner Bros., but they ultimately failed. After the Warner deal collapsed, the studio is reupping a first-look deal with DreamWorks to produce more films from that time.

ImageMovers' first eight films under the name were What Lies Beneath (with Harrison Ford and Michelle Pfeiffer), Cast Away (with Tom Hanks), Matchstick Men (with Nicolas Cage), The Polar Express (also with Tom Hanks), The Prize Winner of Defiance, Ohio (with Julianne Moore), Last Holiday (with Queen Latifah), Monster House (with Mitchel Musso, Sam Lerner, Spencer Locke, and Steve Buscemi), and Beowulf (with Ray Winstone, Anthony Hopkins, John Malkovich, Robin Wright Penn, and Angelina Jolie).

Disney/ImageMovers Digital (2007–2011)

In 2007, ImageMovers and The Walt Disney Company set up a joint venture animation facility known as ImageMovers Digital, based in Marin County-based film company where Zemeckis would produce and direct 3D animated films using CGI performance-capture technology.

On November 6, 2009, ImageMovers Digital released their first CGI film A Christmas Carol, a CGI performance capture film based on the Charles Dickens book of the same name and starring Jim Carrey, Gary Oldman, Colin Firth and Cary Elwes. On March 12, 2010, Disney and ImageMovers announced that ImageMovers Digital would close operations by January 2011 after movie production on Mars Needs Moms was completed. Resulting in a lay-off of approximately 450 employees, Walt Disney Studios president Alan Bergman said, "...given today's economic realities, we need to find alternative ways to bring creative content to audiences and IMD no longer fits into our business model." The company had previously been reported to have Calling All Robots, a remake of Yellow Submarine, a Roger Rabbit sequel and The Nutcracker in development. Disney dropped all of these projects following the box-office failure of Mars Needs Moms.

Universal Pictures (2011–present)
In August 2011, it was announced that ImageMovers has entered a two-year first-look producing deal with Universal Pictures.

Filmography

Television series (Compari Entertainment)
ImageMovers' first foray into television production was The Borgias, which aired on Showtime from 2011 to 2013. On August 25, 2016, Compari Entertainment, the company's television division, was founded, with NBC's Manifest, which premiered on September 24, 2018, as their first television series.
The Borgias (2011–13, Showtime) (produced as ImageMovers)
Manifest (2018–, NBC Season 1–3, Netflix Season 4)
Medal of Honor (2018, Netflix)
Project Blue Book (2019–20, History)
What/If (2019, Netflix)
Tooned Out (TBA, HBO Max)

Cancelled projects

Yellow Submarine 
This motion capture remake of the 1968 Beatles film was developed by Robert Zemeckis. Disney canceled the project due to the box office failure of the Zemeckis-produced motion capture film Mars Needs Moms and aesthetic concerns about the technology. After its cancellation at Disney, Zemeckis then tried to pitch the film to other studios, before eventually losing interest in the project.

Calling All Robots 
On March 26, 2008, Michael Dougherty was set to direct the animated sci-fi adventure film Calling All Robots with Zemeckis producing the film through ImageMovers Digital for Walt Disney Pictures.

Roger Rabbit sequel 
In December 2007, Marshall stated that he was still "open" to the idea, and in April 2009, Zemeckis revealed he was still interested. According to a 2009 MTV News story, Jeffrey Price and Peter S. Seaman were writing a new script for the project, and the animated characters would be in traditional two-dimensional, while the rest would be in motion capture. However, in 2010, Zemeckis said that the sequel would remain hand-drawn animated and live-action sequences will be filmed, just like in the original film, but the lighting effects on the cartoon characters and some of the props that the toons handle will be done digitally. Also in 2010, Hahn, who was the film's original associate producer, confirmed the sequel's development in an interview with Empire. He stated, "Yeah, I couldn't possibly comment. I deny completely, but yeah... if you're a fan, pretty soon you're going to be very, very, very happy." In 2010, Bob Hoskins stated he was interested in the project, reprising his role as Eddie Valiant. However, he retired from acting in 2012 after being diagnosed with Parkinson's disease a year earlier, and died from pneumonia in 2014. Marshall confirmed that the film would be a prequel, similar to earlier drafts, and that the writing was almost complete. During an interview at the premiere of Flight, Zemeckis stated that the sequel was still possible, despite Hoskins' absence, and the script for the sequel was sent to Disney for approval from studio executives.

The Nutcracker 
On November 26, 2009, Zemeckis had signed on to produce and direct the motion capture animated film adaptation of E.T.A. Hoffmann’s The Nutcracker through ImageMovers Digital for Walt Disney Pictures. On July 21, 2016, Universal Pictures revived the adaptation, which may or may not use motion capture, with Zemeckis only set to produce the film and Evan Spiliotopoulos was hired to write the script. There has been no information since.

How to Survive a Garden Gnome Attack 
On April 14, 2011, Zemeckis had signed on to produce and potentially direct the live-action/animated hybrid film adaptation of Chuck Sambuchino's book How to Survive a Garden Gnome Attack along with The Gotham Group and Sony Pictures Animation. In November that year, Chad Damiani and JP Lavin were hired to write the script.

See also  
Uncanny valley

References 

1984 establishments in California
American companies established in 1984
Cinema of the San Francisco Bay Area
Companies based in Marin County, California
Entertainment companies based in California
Film production companies of the United States
Former subsidiaries of The Walt Disney Company
Joint ventures
Mass media companies established in 1984
Novato, California